Stuart Davidson (born 3 August 1979), is a former professional footballer who is currently the manager of Largs Thistle in the Scottish Junior Football Association, West Region. He has previously played in the Scottish Premier League for Kilmarnock.

Career
A tough tackling midfielder nicknamed Arnie, Davidson began his professional career with Kilmarnock. Davidson was given his Scottish Premier League debut by Bobby Williamson in September 1999 versus Celtic, before going out on loan periods at several Scottish Football League clubs, including two spells at Queen of the South. Davidson joined the Dumfries club on a permanent deal in the 2001 close season and his sixteen league appearances the following season earned him a league winners medal as Queens won the Scottish Football League Second Division title.

After moving into Junior football with Troon, Davidson then joined Auchinleck Talbot and enjoyed a successful eight years with the club, winning the Scottish Junior Cup twice, including a man-of-the-match performance in the 2009 final when he scored the winning goal versus Clydebank.

Davidson joined Neilston Juniors in 2012, after a short period out of the game, before his appointment as player-coach at Kilbirnie Ladeside later that year. Former Talbot team-mate Bryan Slavin attracted him to Largs Thistle as his assistant manager in January 2015 and Davidson succeeded him in the role after Slavin's resignation in October 2016.

References

External links

Living people
1979 births
Association football midfielders
Scottish footballers
Kilmarnock F.C. players
Queen of the South F.C. players
Alloa Athletic F.C. players
Airdrieonians F.C. (1878) players
Troon F.C. players
Auchinleck Talbot F.C. players
Neilston Juniors F.C. players
Kilbirnie Ladeside F.C. players
Largs Thistle F.C. players
Scottish Football League players
Scottish Junior Football Association players
Scottish football managers
Scottish Junior Football Association managers